The 1987–88 Soviet Cup was the 20th edition of the Soviet Cup ice hockey tournament. 20 teams participated in the tournament, which was won by CSKA Moscow, who claimed their 12th title. The first games of the tournament took place in September 1986, with the final being held in August 1988.

Participating teams

Tournament

First round

Second round

Quarterfinals

Semifinals

Final

External links 
 Tournament on hockeyarchives.info

Cup
Soviet Cup (ice hockey) seasons